Events in the year 1962 in Belgium.

Incumbents
Monarch: Baudouin
Prime Minister: Théo Lefèvre

Events

 12 April – Standard Liège play Real Madrid
 30 April – Law on conscription to the armed forces institutes obligation of 8 months' service for all able-bodied men.
 1 July – Ruanda-Urundi becomes independent Republic of Rwanda and Kingdom of Burundi
 14 October – Rioting in Brussels between Flemish nationalist and Francophone demonstrators.

Art and architecture

 Royal Institute for Cultural Heritage moves to its new building.

Births
 8 February – Goedele Vermeiren, politician
 16 February – Patrick Davin, conductor (died 2020)
 10 February – Els De Temmerman, journalist 
 17 March – Wim Henderickx, composer (died 2022)
 28 April – Maggie De Block, politician
 29 April – Christine Defraigne, politician
 10 May – Gerda Dendooven, illustrator
 12 July – Dixie Dansercoer, explorer (died 2021)
 22 July – Pieter De Crem, politician
 11 August – Anna Callebaut, cyclist
 29 September - Rita Bellens, politician
 1 November – Hendrik Redant, cyclist
 20 November – Thierry Hancisse, actor
 7 December – Piet Huysentruyt, TV chef
 14 December – Kathleen Vereecken, writer

Deaths
 12 January – Richard de Guide (born 1909), composer
 26 February – Maurice Emile Marie Goetghebuer (born 1876), entomologist
 27 February – Albéric Collin (born 1886), sculptor
 2 March – Charles Jean de la Vallée Poussin (born 1866), mathematician
 1 April – Michel de Ghelderode (born 1898), dramatist
 17 July – Hendrik De Vocht (born 1878), scholar
 20 July – André Renard (born 1911), trade unionist
 7 August – Filip De Pillecyn (born 1891), writer
 13 August – Jean Cuvelier (born 1882), missionary bishop
 30 September – Anne de Borman (born 1881), tennis player
 28 October – Pierre Froidebise (born 1914), organist
 21 December – Fernand Rigaux (born 1905), astronomer

References

 
1960s in Belgium
Belgium
Years of the 20th century in Belgium
Belgium